Oliviero Troia (born 1 September 1994) is an Italian cyclist, who last rode for UCI WorldTeam . In July 2018, he was named in the start list for the Tour de France.

Major results

2012
 6th Road race, UEC European Junior Road Championships
 9th Overall Giro della Lunigiana
2015
 5th Trofeo Edil C
 6th Trofeo Matteotti
2016
 4th Ruota d'Oro
 4th Paris–Roubaix Espoirs
2018
 7th Coppa Bernocchi

Grand Tour general classification results timeline

References

External links

1994 births
Living people
People from Bordighera
Italian male cyclists
Cyclists from Liguria
Sportspeople from the Province of Imperia